The Sunset Hotel was a hotel on the west end of Central Avenue in St. Petersburg, Florida. The hotel was built in 1915 by architect George Feltham, and was popular in the 1920s.

The building is currently operated as the Crystal Bay Hotel, a historic bed & breakfast hotel.

References

External links
 Crystal Bay Hotel
YouTube: Saint Petersburg Florida Crystal Bay Hotel History Located in St. Petersburg Florida

National Register of Historic Places in Pinellas County, Florida
Buildings and structures in St. Petersburg, Florida
Defunct hotels in Florida
1915 establishments in Florida
Hotels established in 1915